Monocrepidius vespertinus, the tobacco wireworm, is a species of click beetle in the family Elateridae.

References

Elateridae
Articles created by Qbugbot
Beetles described in 1801